Tommie James Campbell (born September 19, 1987) is an American former professional gridiron football cornerback. He was drafted by the Tennessee Titans in the seventh round of the 2011 NFL Draft.

High school career
While attending Aliquippa High School, Campbell was a multi-sport star in football, basketball and track.  He was the Pennsylvania state high school sprint champion in 2005.

College career
He went on to play college football at Pitt (2005–2006), Edinboro University (2007), and California (PA) (2010).  Academic problems ended his playing career at Pitt and Edinboro, and he was working as a janitor at Pittsburgh International Airport from 2008 to 2009.  Campbell was afforded a third chance to play college football by the California University of Pennsylvania.  Campbell made good on the third opportunity.  He appeared in all 12 games for California (Pa.).  California coach John Luckhardt said that Campbell's life experiences had helped him mature and quipped, "One of the things he said was that cleaning toilets at 12 o'clock at night really got his attention."  Campbell, in turn, has expressed his gratitude to Coach Luckhardt for giving him another chance: "Cal gave me another shot at pursuing my dream, which is to be a success in the NFL."  Based on his comeback performance in 2010, Campbell was one of only eight Division II players to participate in the 2011 Eastham Energy All-Star Game in Arizona.  He also participated in the Cactus Bowl (Division II All Star Game) in Texas.  Campbell ran a 4.31 40-yard dash at the Cactus Bowl, ranking third among the 300-plus prospects at the event.

Professional career

Tennessee Titans
He was selected by the Tennessee Titans in the seventh round of the 2011 NFL Draft. In a 2012-week 3 matchup against the [Tampa Bay Bucs], in the first quarter, Darius Reynaud caught a punt and threw a Lateral pass to Campbell, who returned the football 65 yards for a touchdown similar to the Music City Miracle. The Titans would win 44–41 in Overtime. On August 29, 2014, he was released.

Jacksonville Jaguars
Campbell signed with the Jacksonville Jaguars after a season-ending injury to cornerback Alan Ball. He was waived on August 29, 2015.

Calgary Stampeders
Campbell started all 18 games and had 71 defensive tackles including a tackle for a loss, 1 special-teams tackle, 3 interceptions and 9 knockdowns, one of his interceptions being a game winning one in an overtime victory against the BC Lions in week 3. He also added four punt returns for 21 yards. He was named a West Division all-star. On January 24, 2017, Campbell turned himself into police custody after being charged with multiple drug related charges. Police believed he was selling drugs out of his residence in Aliquippa, Pennsylvania during the CFL off-season. However, the charges were subsequently dropped and his record cleared. Campbell returned to the Stamps for the team's 2017 training camp.

Montreal Alouettes
Campbell signed with the Montreal Alouettes on February 13, 2018.  He was considered one of the top free agents on the market, having not allowed a touchdown during the 2017 regular season,  On September 20, 2018, Campbell and the Alouettes agreed to a two-year contract extension; keeping him with the club through the 2020 season. Campbell finished the 2018 season with 38 tackles, 1 interception, and one forced fumble in 17 games played; Campbell was removed from the lineup for one game by head coach Mike Sherman for not buckling a chin strap at practice earlier in the week. Although the Alouettes finished the season out of playoff contention with a 5–13 record, Campbell and the ball-hawk Montreal defense helped improve the team's record by two wins from the previous season. Campbell got off to a fast start in 2019, forcing 3 turnovers in Montreal's first 4 games. In 16 games, Campbell made 66 tackles, 3 interceptions, and two forced fumbles, and was named a divisional All-Star. He was released by the Alouettes on January 31, 2020.

Toronto Argonauts
On February 5, 2020, Campbell signed with the Toronto Argonauts. He announced his retirement from football on December 30, 2020.

References

External links
Toronto Argonauts bio
Tennessee Titans bio
California Vulcans bio

1987 births
Living people
African-American players of American football
African-American players of Canadian football
American football cornerbacks
Calgary Stampeders players
California Vulcans football players
Canadian football defensive backs
Jacksonville Jaguars players
People from Aliquippa, Pennsylvania
Players of American football from Pennsylvania
Sportspeople from the Pittsburgh metropolitan area
Tennessee Titans players
Toronto Argonauts players
Montreal Alouettes players
Pittsburgh Panthers football players
Edinboro Fighting Scots football players
21st-century African-American sportspeople
20th-century African-American people